North Raker is a  mountain summit located in Boise County, Idaho, United States.

Description
North Raker, also known colloquially as "The Rakers", is part of the Sawtooth Range which is a subset of the Rocky Mountains. The remote mountain is situated 18 miles south-southwest of Stanley, Idaho, in the Sawtooth National Recreation Area. Precipitation runoff from the mountain drains to the South Fork Payette River via Pinchot Creek (west slope) and Fall Creek (east slope). The first ascent of the summit was made by Fred Beckey and Pete Schoening in 1949. This landform's toponym has been officially adopted by the United States Board on Geographic Names. The descriptive name was applied in 1927 by surveyor Arval Anderson and refers to how the shape of the peak resembles the "raker tooth" of a crosscut saw.

Climate
Based on the Köppen climate classification, North Raker is located in an alpine subarctic climate zone with long, cold, snowy winters, and cool to warm summers. Winter temperatures can drop below −10 °F with wind chill factors below −30 °F.

Gallery

See also
 List of mountain peaks of Idaho

References

External links
 North Raker: Idaho: A Climbing Guide
 North Raker: weather forecast
 The Rakers (photo): Flickr

Mountains of Idaho
Mountains of Boise County, Idaho
North American 3000 m summits
Boise National Forest